El Hugeirat (also El Hagarat) is a moribund Hill Nubian language spoken in the northern Nuba Mountains in the south of Sudan. It is spoken by around 50 people in a few families in the El Hugeirat hills, in the villages of Sija, Bija, Shenshin and Baboy.

References 

Nubian languages
Languages of Sudan
Severely endangered languages